The Sun Odyssey 39i is a French sailboat that was designed by Marc Lombard as a cruiser and first built in 2005.

The "i" in the designation indicates that the deck is injection-molded.

Production
The design was built by Jeanneau in France, from 2005 to 2010, with more than 1,000 built, but it is now out of production.

The boat was replaced in production by the Sun Odyssey 409.

Design
The Sun Odyssey 39i is a recreational keelboat, built predominantly of fiberglass, with wood trim. It has a fractional sloop rig, a nearly-plumb stem, a reverse transom with steps and a swimming platform, an internally mounted spade-type rudder controlled by dual wheels and a fixed fin keel with a weighted bulb on the GTE model, an optional shoal-draft keel on the PTE  model or a deep-draft keel on the "Performance" model. There is a dedicated life raft locker in the stern skirt.

The design has sleeping accommodation for four to six people, in two and three-cabin layouts, respectively. In the two-cabin version there is a double "V"-berth in the bow cabin, a "U"-shaped settee and a straight settee in the main cabin and an aft cabin with a double berth on the starboard side side. A third cabin is added by dividing the aft cabin into two cabins. The galley is located on the starboard side just forward of the companionway ladder. The galley is "L"-shaped and is equipped with a three-burner stove, an ice box and a double sink. A navigation station is opposite the galley, on the port side. The head is located just aft of the bow cabin on the port side and includes a separate shower. On the three cabin model the head is smaller and the shower is not separate.

Operational history
In a 2007 review for Cruising World, Andrew Burton wrote, "the Jeanneau Sun Odyssey 39i shares many of the qualities of the 39 DS. Thanks to a generous beam carried well aft, interior volume is greater than one would expect on a 39-footer. The boat's a breeze to operate under sail or power: The helm is light, and the boat responds obediently to a flick of the fingers on the wheel."

See also
List of sailing boat types

References

External links

Keelboats
2000s sailboat type designs
Sailing yachts
Sailboat type designs by Marc Lombard Design
Sailboat types built by Jeanneau